Emmett Edward Barrett (November 7, 1916 – May 2, 2005) was an American football center who played one season with the New York Giants of the National Football League. He played college football at University of Portland and attended Trinity High School in Sioux City, Iowa.

References

External links
Just Sports Stats

1916 births
2005 deaths
Players of American football from Iowa
American football centers
Portland Pilots football players
New York Giants players
Sportspeople from Sioux City, Iowa